Arlington Public Schools can refer to these U.S. school districts:

 Arlington Public Schools in Arlington County, Virginia
 Arlington Public Schools in Arlington, Massachusetts
 Arlington Public Schools in Arlington, Nebraska
 Arlington Public Schools in Arlington, Washington

See also
 Arlington Central School District in Poughkeepsie, New York
 Arlington Heights School District 25 in Arlington Heights, Illinois
 Arlington Independent School District in Arlington, Texas
 Arlington School District in Arlington, Oregon
 Mount Arlington School District in Mount Arlington, New Jersey
 North Arlington School District in North Arlington, New Jersey
 Upper Arlington City School District in Upper Arlington, Ohio